In June 2022, the Viking Saga, the student newspaper of Northwest High School in Grand Island, Nebraska, in the United States, published an issue that discussed Pride Month and other LGBTQ-related topics. In response, the school board and superintendent eliminated the school's journalism program and closed down the paper. The newspaper had been advised that transgender staff should not use their preferred names on bylines, and must use the names they had been given at birth.

Background 
The Viking Saga had been published by students of Northwest High School for 54 years, from 1968 to 2022.  In 2022, student journalists from Northwest Public Schools, the school district covering the high school, finished in third place in the Nebraska School Activities Association's state journalism championship.

Shutdown 

In April 2022, Northwest Public Schools issued a reprimand to the Viking Saga because transgender staff were using their preferred pronouns and chosen names in article bylines.  The administration instructed the staff that they should be using birth names, known as deadnaming.  According to Marcus Pennell, a transgender columnist for the Viking Saga who graduated in 2022, the students were coerced into obeying by being told that their faculty advisor would suffer the consequences if they did not comply.  Pennell described the administration as bullying LGBT students.

The June issue, printed on May 16, included a number of student editorials on LGBTQ-related topics, as well as a news article about Pride Month, which occurs annually in June.  On May 19, the Viking Saga staff was informed that the journalism program was to be shut down.  A letter was sent to the newspaper's printer on May 22 canceling the use of their printing services. Jeanette Ramsey, the director of teaching and learning of Northwest Public Schools, stated that the decision to shut down the newspaper was made by the school principal P. J. Smith and the school board's superintendent of schools Jeff Edwards.

School board officials confirmed that they were "upset" by the "editorial content".  Dan Leiser, the president of the Northwest Public Schools Board of Education, remarked in reference to the controversial stories that "most people were upset they were written".  Zach Mader, the vice president of the board, stated: "I do think there have been talks of doing away with our newspaper if we were not going to be able to control content that we saw (as) inappropriate."  An unnamed employee of the Northwest School District stated that "the (journalism and newspaper) program was cut because the school board and superintendent are unhappy with the last issue's editorial content".

Response 
On August 31, Edwards said that news reports on the incident by the media were "both correct and incorrect", adding that publication of the Viking Saga was only paused and that other student journalism activities such as the yearbook were continuing.  He stated that it was "misleading" to characterize the reason for the actions against the newspaper as being based on a small number of published articles.

Mike Hiestand, a senior legal counsel for the Student Press Law Center (SPLC), noted that schools were increasingly shutting down student newspapers as a form of censorship, observing that "you can't censor a student newspaper you no longer have".  He observed that the most common censorship trigger was a story that criticized the school or that the administration perceived to make them look bad. According to a lawyer from the SPLC who was also a former student of the school and present at the time, the administration considered it "controversial" that the student journalists were using their preferred names instead of the names they were assigned at birth.  SPLC executive director Hadar Harris said that this was not the only case of censorship of a school newspaper in the state, writing that "Nebraska has become a center for a number of egregious censorship cases in recent years, but the Saga case also indicates a nationwide trend of administrators increasingly censoring LGBTQIA+ related content, including chosen names and pronouns".

The Nebraska branch of the American Civil Liberties Union (ACLU) said that the move was viewpoint discrimination that violated the Constitution of the United States.  In a letter to Edwards, the ACLU chapter said that shutting down the Viking Saga violated the students' rights under the First and Fourteenth Amendments, as well as Title IX protections against sexual discrimination, noting that "the district cannot censor student journalism because district leadership disagrees with LGBTQ rights and wishes to keep students from encountering viewpoints that do not align with that perceived viewpoint".

Supreme Court cases 
The magazine Reason took exception to the school administration's closure of the Viking Saga, observing that the decision was based not on the quality of the writing but rather on the opinions expressed by the publication.  They noted that practicing writing and debating skills was an important part of the educational experience and cited two relevant United States Supreme Court decisions; Tinker v. Des Moines Independent Community School District (1969) asserted that "students do not lose their First Amendment freedoms on school grounds", but Hazelwood v. Kuhlmeier (1988) gave school boards "wide authority to censor school newspapers".

Max Kautsch, an attorney for the Nebraska Press Association specializing in media law, said that "the decision by the administration to eliminate the student newspaper violates students' right to free speech, unless the school can show a legitimate educational reason for removing the option to participate in a class... that publishes award-winning material", adding that "it is hard to imagine what the legitimate reason could be".  The Grand Island Independent reported that print media has a constitutional right to determine its editorial content, citing the 1974 case Miami Herald Publishing Co. v. Tornillo.

References

External links 
 Viking Saga, June 2022, full issue
 
 
 

2022 controversies in the United States
2022 disestablishments in Nebraska
2022 in LGBT history
Grand Island, Nebraska
Student newspapers published in Nebraska
LGBT in Nebraska
Censorship in the United States
Censorship of LGBT issues
LGBT pride
Transgender history in the United States
Freedom of speech in the United States
Freedom of the press
LGBT-related controversies in the United States
June 2022 events in the United States